The Greifenbach is a river in Saxony, Germany. It is a left tributary of the Zschopau, which it joins near Tannenberg.

See also
List of rivers of Saxony

Rivers of Saxony
Rivers of the Ore Mountains
Rivers of Germany